Flåm Station is located at the village of Flåm in Aurland, Norway. The station marks the terminus  for Flåm Line (Flåmsbana). The station is served by the tourist trains on the Flåm Line and operated by Vy as a subcontractor for Flåm Utvikling.

History

The station opened on 1 August 1940 for freight, and the year after for passenger traffic. The station was built to allow transfer from ferries operating on Sognefjord to the Bergen Line at Myrdal Station. Marketing of the service was transferred to Flåm Utvikling in 1998; after this a new station building was opened, and the old station building converted to a railway museum. 

Flåm is one of Norway's largest tourist attractions, with an estimated half a million visitors annually. The Flåm Railway Documentation Centre provides information into the  building of the Flåm Railway  and  the technical challenge facing this engineering work through the use of  different exhibitions with text, image and sound.

References

External links
Entry at the Norwegian National Rail Administration 

Railway stations on the Flåm Line
Railway stations in Aurland
Railway stations opened in 1940
1940 establishments in Norway